Dominique Berna (born 15 June 1964) is a French judoka. She competed in the women's half-lightweight event at the 1992 Summer Olympics.

References

External links
 

1964 births
Living people
French female judoka
Olympic judoka of France
Judoka at the 1992 Summer Olympics
Sportspeople from Lyon